Chung Pao-ming (born 13 December 1961) is a Taiwanese boxer. He competed in the men's light flyweight event at the 1984 Summer Olympics. At the 1984 Summer Olympics, he lost to Keith Mwila of Zambia.

References

1961 births
Living people
Taiwanese male boxers
Olympic boxers of Taiwan
Boxers at the 1984 Summer Olympics
Place of birth missing (living people)
Light-flyweight boxers
20th-century Taiwanese people